The 2019 NCAA Division I Men's Lacrosse Championship was the 49th annual single-elimination tournament to determine the national championship for National Collegiate Athletic Association (NCAA) Division I men's college lacrosse.

Teams

Bracket

Game summaries
All times Eastern.

Play–in game

First round

Quarterfinals

Semifinals

National Championship

References

NCAA Division I Men's Lacrosse Championship
Lacrosse
 
NCAA Division I Men's Lacrosse
Lacrosse in Pennsylvania
Sports in Philadelphia
NCAA Division I Men's Lacrosse Championship